Deniz Melissa Burnham (born October 1, 1985) is a lieutenant in the United States Navy Reserve and NASA astronaut candidate.

Early life and education
Deniz Burnham was born at Incirlik Air Base in Adana, Turkey to parents Ed and Şahver Burnham. She relocated various times throughout her childhood due to her military family. Her Turkish mother had aspired to be a military officer, but women were not allowed to in Turkey at the time. She later joined the United States Air Force. 

Eventually, Burnham moved to Fairfield, California, graduating from Vanden High School. In 2007, Burnham graduated from the University of California, San Diego with a bachelor's degree in chemical engineering. In 2017, she graduated from the University of Southern California with a master's degree in mechanical engineering. During her time in graduate school, Burnham served as an intern at the NASA Ames Research Center.

Career
For over a decade, Burnham has led offshore oil drilling operations in various locations across the United States and Canada. Burnham currently serves in the United States Navy Reserve as the executive officer of a shipyard operations unit in Alameda, California.

Astronaut candidacy
On December 6, 2021, Burnham was revealed to be one of ten candidates selected as part NASA Astronaut Group 23.

Personal life
Burnham currently lives in Wasilla, Alaska with her fiancé Shaun Little. Burnham holds a private pilot license, as well as helicopter and instrument ratings.

References

Astronaut candidates
University of Southern California alumni
University of California, San Diego alumni
Living people
1985 births
American people of Turkish descent
People from Adana
People from Fairfield, California
People from Wasilla, Alaska